Deh-e Now Dasht (also Romanized as Dehnow Dasht) is a village in Jolgeh Rural District, in the Central District of Behabad County, Yazd Province, Iran. At the 2006 census, its population was 185, in 55 families.

References 

Populated places in Behabad County